Viviers Cathedral is a Roman Catholic church in the town of Viviers in the department of Ardèche, France. It is the seat of the Bishop of Viviers.

The construction of the tower dates from the 11th century, and the greater part of the rest of the building from the 12th century. The vaulted ceiling was destroyed during the Wars of Religion of the 16th century, and was not reconstructed until the 18th century, when the work was carried out by Jean-Baptiste Franque.

The cathedral has been protected as a monument historique since 9 August 1906.

One of the spires of the cathedral was destroyed by a lightning strike on the night of September 25 to 26, 2021. Already undergoing restoration after the earthquake of November 2019, the cathedral now needs additional repair works.

References

Sources
 www.culture.gouv.fr: Cathédrales - Viviers: historical photographs 
 Patrimoine de France 
 Catholic Hierarchy: Diocese of Viviers
 

Roman Catholic cathedrals in France
Churches in Ardèche